The Health & Social Care Business Services Organisation was established in 2009 and is responsible for providing support services to various health and social work agencies in Northern Ireland.

It was created from the now defunct Central Services Agency.

External links
 Website

Health and Social Care (Northern Ireland)
2009 establishments in Northern Ireland